Braid, also known as Dying to Play and Nobody Leaves, is a 2018 American psychological horror thriller film written and directed by Mitzi Peirone and starring Madeline Brewer, Imogen Waterhouse, Sarah Hay, and Scott Cohen.

Plot
Petula and Tilda are young artists in New York who make a living as drug dealers. After losing their stash and money while barely escaping police, they are given two days to repay their supplier. The two reconnect with their wealthy but mentally unstable childhood friend Daphne, who lives alone in a remote rural mansion, in the hopes of finding a safe in her house that is full of money. The girls rekindle an intricate fantasy game they played as children - one in which Tilda assumes the role of a young girl, Daphne her mother, and Petula a visiting doctor. The game has three rules - everyone must play, no outsiders allowed, and nobody leaves.

Daphne makes Petula do increasingly bizarre things as the game progresses, such as shattering Tilda’s kneecap with a hammer and simulating sexual intercourse with Daphne. Tilda suffers from a bad drug trip, interspersed with a flashback of an argument between the three girls during their childhood that led to Daphne being pushed out of the treehouse and landing on her head, resulting in her current unstable mental state which causes her to believe the game they’re playing is real. In the present, Daphne has bound and gagged Petula and Tilda, having fully lost herself to the delusion that she is actually their mother.

Daphne is visited by Detective Siegel, who knew all three girls when they were children, after he receives reports of screams coming from her home. Though Daphne's odd behavior makes him suspicious, he leaves after she reminds him that he doesn't have a search warrant. Daphne later gives Petula clues to the location and code of the safe, and promises to free the girls if she can find it. Petula succeeds and the girls escape, but are pursued by Daphne, who runs Petula over with her car before taking them back to her mansion.

Daphne cuffs Petula to a chair and locks Tilda in a cage, forcing the latter to watch as she gives Petula a Glasgow smile. The next morning, Daphne tells them that the "game" has concluded and that they are free to leave, but also that she believes she has become pregnant from her faux sexual encounter with Petula. Realizing that this gives them new power over her, Petula restarts the game by convincing Daphne that she needs to be taken in for an emergency caesarean section.

Just as the two girls are about to attack an unconscious Daphne with surgical tools, they are stopped by Spiegel, but Daphne wakes up and repeatedly stabs him. Tilda gleefully joins her, while Petula initially watches on in horror, but eventually joins the other two in bludgeoning him to death. They bury his body in Daphne’s yard before all three women return to living in the mansion and playing the game, their scars from the injuries inflicted by Daphne having miraculously disappeared. As Petula grows increasingly wary of her surroundings, it is eventually revealed that the entire movie has taken place within Daphne’s mansion—every event that occurred up until this point was merely a part of the game, which Tilda is in on as well—and that Petula has tried to escape several times, only to be punished each time by having her arms burned. This "round" of the game concludes when all three women pretend to commit suicide, only to begin again, showing Daphne as an old woman in a dilapidated house, suggesting that they have been playing for many years.

Cast
 Madeline Brewer as Daphne Peters/Mother
 Imogen Waterhouse as Petula Thames/Doctor
 Sarah Hay as Tilda Darlings/Daughter
 Scott Cohen as Detective Siegel

Background and casting

Braid is the first feature film of Mitzi Peirone, who serves as both writer and director. The three main characters are played by Madeline Brewer (Daphne), Imogen Waterhouse (Petula) and Sarah Hay (Tilda), whereas Zoe Feigelson, Dhoni Middleton and Tai Lyn Sandhu portray their young alter egos.

Supporting characters include Scott Cohen as local police detective Siegel, Brad Calcaterra as a homeless man who sees Petula and Tilda arrive at the train station, and Rob Leo Roy as the train conductor.

In 2018, Braid was shown at several film festivals. It had a limited theatrical release in early 2019 while also available as video-on-demand.

Reception
The average score was 7.3 out 10.

Katie Walsh of the Los Angeles Times lauded the film for its cinematography and visual style as well as for its willingness to explore darker aspects of female friendship, describing it as a "uniquely feminine horror film". Glenn Kenny of The New York Times considered the film "a bitter parable on failing to chase childhood dreams".<ref name="nyt">Glenn Kenny: [https://www.nytimes.com/2019/01/31/movies/braid-review.html Braid' Review: Childhood Friends Play a Dangerous Game in This Jumpy Thriller]. The New York Times, January 31, 2019.</ref> Matt Zoller Seitz of RogerEbert.com gave it 3.5 out of 4 stars, remarking that he "came away feeling that I'd seen, if not a major film, then a film by major talents".

References

External links
 
 
 'Braid': Film Review. The Hollywood Reporter, February 1, 2019.
 Gender Bashing: Feminine Fantasy in BRAID, Deadcentral.com''.

2018 films
2018 directorial debut films
2018 horror thriller films
2010s psychological horror films
2018 psychological thriller films
American horror thriller films
American psychological horror films
American psychological thriller films
Films set in country houses
2010s English-language films
2010s American films